Sanitarium is a psychological horror point-and-click adventure video game that was originally released for Microsoft Windows. It was developed by DreamForge Intertainment and published by ASC Games in 1998. It was a commercial success, with sales around 300,000 units. In 2015, it was ported to iOS and Android devices.

Plot
After a car accident knocks him unconscious, a man awakens from a coma, his face fully bandaged, to find that he has been admitted to a dilapidated sanitarium and that he cannot remember who he is or where he came from, or how he came to be there. His fellow inmates seem to know him simply as "Max".

As he delves deeper into the asylum's corridors in search of answers, Max finds himself transported to various obscure and otherworldly locations: a small town inhabited only by malformed children and overseen by a malevolent alien entity known only as "Mother", a demented circus surrounded by an endless ocean and terrorized by a squid-like individual, an alien hive overrun by cyborg insects, and an Aztec village devastated by the return of the god Quetzalcoatl. Between each episode, Max returns to the asylum grounds, blending real and unreal, each time closer to regaining his memory and unraveling the truth surrounding the mysterious Dr. Morgan, head of the asylum. He remembers the death of his younger sister Sarah years ago and the real reason behind his institutionalization. It is revealed that Max was working on a cure for a deadly disease, but his rival, Jacob Morgan, didn't like this. He sabotaged Max's car and caused him to have an accident. Max is in a coma, trapped in a dreamworld. He must wake up and expose Dr. Morgan's crimes.

Gameplay

The game uses an isometric perspective and a non-tiled 2D navigational system. Each world and setting carries a distinct atmosphere that presents either the real world, the imaginary world, or a mix of both of the main protagonist. In many cases, it is unclear to the player if the world the character is currently in is real or a product of Max's own imagination. This indistinction underlines much of the horror portrayed in the game.

The game is separated into different levels or "chapters" with each having a different style and atmosphere. The player must find clues, solve puzzles and interact with other characters to reach a final challenge where the player must reach the end of a path while avoiding obstacles. If the player fails to do so (by, for instance, getting killed) then the player is transported back to the beginning of the path without losing progress, thus a Game Over in this game is non-existent. When the player reaches the end of the path, a cinematic is played and the game proceeds to the next chapter.

Release
The game was published by ASC Games.

Reception

Sanitarium was commercially successful. According to Mike Nicholson of DreamForge, the game sold roughly 300,000 copies. Chris Kellner of DTP Entertainment, which handled Sanitariums German localization, reported its lifetime sales between 10,000 and 50,000 copies in the region.

According to PC Accelerator, Sanitarium was a "critical success" that helped to raise DreamForge Intertainment's profile as a company.

Awards
Sanitarium won Computer Gaming Worlds 1998 "Best Adventure" award, tied with Grim Fandango. The editors wrote that the game "came from out of nowhere to provide the creepiest, most compelling, and best-told story of the year, bar none". Computer Games Strategy Plus, PC Gamer US, GameSpot, IGN and the Academy of Interactive Arts & Sciences (AIAS) all nominated Sanitarium as the best adventure game of 1998, but it lost these awards to Grim Fandango. PC Gamer USs editors remarked that Sanitarium has beautiful graphics, interesting characters, and well-designed puzzles.

The game was also a nominee for GameSpot's "Best Story" and the AIAS's "Outstanding Achievement in Character or Story Development" awards, which went to StarCraft and Pokémon Red and Blue, respectively.

Legacy
In 2013, a programmer from the Sanitarium development team announced a project on Kickstarter called Shades of Sanity that was touted as the spiritual successor to Sanitarium. The project failed to attain funding. In 2015, a Kickstarter-funded adventure game called Stasis was released by a South African independent studio The Brotherhood. It has been compared to Sanitarium.

On October 29, 2015, DotEmu released an iOS port of Sanitarium with touchscreen controls, dynamic hint system, achievements and automatic save system.

In 2011, Adventure Gamers named Sanitarium the 36th-best adventure game ever released.

On August 1, 2022, ScummVM added support for playing Sanitarium using the original Windows game files, enabling it to be played on the various platforms ScummVM itself supports.

See also
 John Saul's Blackstone Chronicles

References

External links
 
 
 Sanitarium review, Adventure Classic Gaming
 Postmortem: DreamForge's Sanitarium, Gamasutra

1998 video games
1990s horror video games
Android (operating system) games
IOS games
Point-and-click adventure games
Psychological horror games
ScummVM-supported games
Single-player video games
Video games about amnesia
Video games developed in the United States
Video games set in psychiatric hospitals
Video games with isometric graphics
Windows games
DTP Entertainment games
DreamForge Intertainment games
ASC Games games